Bryan Jones Anicézio (born 23 January 1990), sometimes known as just Bryan, is a Brazilian professional footballer who plays as a forward for Malaysia Premier League club Sarawak United.

Club career

Brazil
Bryan Jones spent his youth from the age of 13 at Guarani and later on, at Internacional.

In 2011, Bryan Jones joined the senior team of Internacional, and they won the Gaúcho that year.

Later that year, in July, Bryan Jones was loaned to Criciúma of the Série B. He made his debut on 23 July, in a league match against Paraná, substituting Ronny in the 68th minute. Apart from his debut, he played only one more game for the club.

In 2012, Bryan Jones joined Palmeiras B of the Paulista A2 and played 7 games for the club, coming on as a substitute in all 7 games.

At the beginning of 2013, Bryan Jones joined CRB of the Série C to compete with them in the Copa do Nordeste, at the same time as Paulo Sérgio, signing a contract until 15 December. He only played one game for the club.

A month later, Bryan Jones had a chance to return to Palmeiras, but decided to join Tupi, who compete in the Série D and the Mineiro leagues, giving praise to the club's tradition. He only played one game for Tupi, in the Copa do Brasil.

Israel
In September 2013, Bryan Jones signed a year-long contract with Beitar Jerusalem of the Israeli Premier League.

Bryan Jones scored his debut goal on 8 December, in a match against Maccabi Tel Aviv. In the 83rd minute he shot the ball with his right foot from the edge of the box after a solo run.

On 11 August 2014 signed to Hapoel Ramat Gan.

Back to Brazil
Bryan Jones returned to Brazil in January 2019, when he signed with Luverdense on 11 January. The club announced his departure in April 2019.

Honours
With Internacional
 Gaúcho: 2011

With CRB
 Alagoano: 2013

References

External links

1990 births
Living people
Brazilian footballers
Sport Club Internacional players
Criciúma Esporte Clube players
Clube de Regatas Brasil players
Tupi Football Club players
Beitar Jerusalem F.C. players
Hapoel Ramat Gan F.C. players
Al-Nahda Club (Saudi Arabia) players
Al-Adalah FC players
Ironi Nesher F.C. players
Luverdense Esporte Clube players
Expatriate footballers in Israel
Brazilian expatriate sportspeople in Israel
Expatriate footballers in Saudi Arabia
Brazilian expatriate sportspeople in Saudi Arabia
Association football forwards
Israeli Premier League players
Liga Leumit players
Saudi First Division League players
Sportspeople from Campinas